Mark Weingarten is an American production sound mixer. He has been nominated for five Academy Awards for Best Sound, winning in 2017 for Dunkirk and in 2022 for Top Gun: Maverick. He has worked on more than 120 films since 1987. In addition, he won an Emmy for the television show The West Wing.

Selected filmography
 The Curious Case of Benjamin Button (2008)
 The Social Network (2010)
 Interstellar (2014)
 Dunkirk (2017)

References

External links

Year of birth missing (living people)
Living people
American audio engineers
Emmy Award winners
Best Sound Mixing Academy Award winners
Best Sound BAFTA Award winners